The  San Diego Chargers season was the franchise's 29th season in the National Football League (NFL), its 39th overall and was the second and final season under Kevin Gilbride. After a 2–4 start, Gilbride was fired and June Jones coached the final ten games of the season as interim head coach, the team going 3–7 under his stewardship. San Diego's defense led the league in yards allowed; however, a weak offense under infamous draft bust quarterback Ryan Leaf meant that the team was last in the AFC West. The team scored a total of 241 points, an average of 15.1 points per game, the second lowest in the NFL, with only the Philadelphia Eagles performing worse with 161 (10.1 per game).

With the retirement of Stan Humphries, the Chargers went into the 1998 draft seeking a new quarterback. There were two outstanding prospects; when Indianapolis took future Hall of Famer Peyton Manning as the #1 pick, Leaf went to San Diego. Immediately named the starter, he began 2–0 before an infamous performance at Kansas City, after which he was caught on camera shouting at a reporter.

Leaf finished with 15 interceptions and only two touchdown passes in ten games; Craig Whelihan replaced him as the starter for the final seven games, but also performed poorly. The two combined for 34 interceptions, the worst tally in the NFL for a decade; San Diego had 51 turnovers in total, 8 more than any other team in 1998. The inexperienced quarterbacks were hampered by the departure of star receiver Tony Martin during the offseason. In his absence, Charlie Jones led the team with 699 yards, while tight end Freddie Jones had the most receptions with 57. Natrone Means returned to lead the rushing attack after two seasons in Jacksonville. He performed well prior to a season-ending injury, gaining 883 yards in ten games.

On defense, Norman Hand was promoted to starting defensive tackle, and led the team with 6.0 sacks; Greg Jackson had the most interceptions, with six. Pro bowlers Junior Seau and Rodney Harrison made 115 and 114 tackles respectively – the most any other player had was 63. Kicker John Carney, who had been injured for most of the previous season, returned and converted 26 attempts out of 30.

The ineffective offense, and rookie Leaf's obnoxious behavior toward teammates, damaged morale; outside linebacker Lew Bush recalled, "Try going into a game you
have no chance of winning, knowing that if you give up more than one touchdown, it's over". Strong safety Rodney Harrison described the season as "a nightmare you can't even imagine. If I had to go through another year like that, I'd probably quit playing".

Following the season, Oregon State head coach Mike Riley was named Chargers' head coach.

Offseason

NFL draft

Personnel

Staff

Roster

Regular season

Schedule

Note: Intra-division opponents are in bold text.

Game summaries

Week 1: vs. Buffalo Bills 

A missed field goal allowed the Chargers to escape with a win on Ryan Leaf's debut. Leaf had an uncertain start, fumbling his first snap (the Chargers recovered), and throwing an interception in Bills' territory. The San Diego defense, however, allowed only 73 yards in the first half, and the Chargers led 3–0 at the break.

Leaf found Bryan Still for 67 yards on the first play of the 3rd quarter, and hit the same player on a fade route two plays later for his first NFL touchdown pass. However, with San Diego up 13–7 in the 4th quarter, Leaf threw his second interception, setting up Buffalo for a 31-yard drive culminating when Doug Flutie and Andre Reed combined for their second touchdown pass of the day. John Carney's 54-yard field goal on the next possession clipped the upright but still went through, restoring the lead.

Buffalo faced a 4th and 26 on their final possession, but a 36-yard pass interference penalty on Terrence Shaw kept the drive going. Seven plays later, Steve Christie, who had earlier missed from just 21 yards out, pushed a 39-yarder wide left with three seconds left, and the Chargers had the win.

This game constituted the first time since 1985 that the Chargers played the Buffalo Bills. The reason for this is that before the admission of the Texans in 2002, NFL scheduling formulas for games outside a team's division were much more influenced by table position during the previous season.

Week 2: at Tennessee Oilers 

Another strong defensive performance gave San Diego their second win. The lone Tennessee score was aided by a fake punt on 4th and 10; after Natrone Means put the Chargers up 13–7 in the 3rd quarter, the Oilers failed to cross midfield in their final four possessions. Ryan Leaf had a cleaner game, passing for 179 yards with no turnovers, while rushing for 31 yards, including a 20-yard scramble that set up Means' touchdown. Leaf became the first rookie to start 2–0 since John Elway in 1983, but would win only twice more in his entire career.

Week 3: at Kansas City Chiefs 

The Chiefs' defense brought Ryan Leaf savagely back down to earth, as he posted the only 0.0 passer rating by any QB during the 1998 season. Leaf completed 1 pass in 15 attempts for 4 yards, with no touchdowns and two interceptions – he also lost three fumbles, committing five turnovers on the Chargers' first seven possessions. With a pair of sacks pushing them to minus-19 net passing yards, the Chargers had the worst total by any NFL team for 13 years.

Natrone Means was the lone bright spot on offense; he ran 22 times for a career-high 165 yards, and prevented the shutout with a career-long 72 yard touchdown run.

Week 4: vs. New York Giants 

Leaf struggled again, throwing interceptions on three consecutive first half possessions as the Giants built a 21–0 lead. An improvement saw John Carney hit three field goals in quick succession, sandwiched around the halftime break, closing the gap to 12 points. However, Leaf then threw a fourth interception, this one returned by Percy Ellsworth for a touchdown. The rookie QB was then benched for Craig Whelihan, who promptly hit Charlie Jones for a 41-yard touchdown, but could get the team no closer.

Week 5: at Indianapolis Colts 

This game featured the first two picks in the 1998 NFL draft. Ryan Leaf had previously outplayed Peyton Manning in a preseason game, but this was their first and only competitive meeting.

Manning had the better start, hitting Marshall Faulk for the opening score after Leaf had been intercepted; a trick play on the conversion made it 8–0 to the Colts. The defenses took over from there, with two field goals each the only scores until the final few minutes. Then Leaf found Charlie Jones for a 56-yard completion down to the one, and Means ran it in on the next play. However, Leaf's two-point conversion pass fell incomplete, leaving the score at 14–12. Indianapolis recovered an onside kick attempt and added a field goal, before stopping San Diego on downs with 33 seconds remaining.

The win was Peyton Manning's first in the NFL. The two quarterbacks had nearly identical stat lines, each completing 12 of 23 passes while throwing one interception. Leaf had a small yardage advantage (160 to 137), while Manning had the game's lone touchdown pass. Means rushed for 130 yards on 31 carries.

Week 6: at Oakland Raiders 

A late lapse cost the Chargers victory in a game of uncommon defensive dominance. The Raiders' Leo Araguz set an NFL record by punting 16 times in the game, with 14 of these coming after going three-and-out. Starting QB Donald Hollis completed only 12 passes out of 35 for 101 yards and an interception, while their rushing attack was limited to 18 yards on 18 carries.

San Diego's offense fared little better. They opened the scoring with a John Carney field goal, but that came after a 56-yard punt return by Latario Rachal set them up at the Raiders' 20. Ryan Leaf completed 7 of 18 passes for 78 yards, with three passes picked off. After the last of these, he was pulled in favour of Craig Whelihan, who threw a further interception on his second passing attempt. On their next possession, the Chargers quit attempting to pass entirely, calling nothing but runs on a 13 play, 68-yard drive that took up most of the 4th quarter, and led to Carney's second field goal.

Following an exchange of punts, the Raiders took over on their own 32, where they faced a 3rd and 10 with 1:38 remaining. Backup QB Wade Wilson, who had missed on his first six passes, then found James Jett behind the defense for the winning touchdown. San Diego tried to respond, but on a 4th and 6 from the Raiders' 38, Means was stopped inches short of a first down and Oakland ran out the clock.

Means was again the lone highlight on offense for the Chargers, gaining 101 yards on 37 carries, while his 167 combined yards rushing and receiving accounted for over 85% of the Chargers 195 yards of total offense. For the Raiders, over 42% of their 159 yards came on the winning play.

Head coach Kevin Gilbride was fired three days after the game. Quarterbacks coach June Jones took his place for the remainder of the campaign.

The NFL released highlights of the game, titled "The UGLIEST Win EVER!"

Week 7: vs. Philadelphia Eagles 

In a familiar story, it was Natrone Means (112 yards) and the defense who led San Diego as they broke their four-game losing streak. Means rushed four times for 32 yards on the game's opening possession, leading to a field goal; on the first Charger drive of the second half, he carried four times for 43 yards and a touchdown. Leaf passed for only 83 yards, and lost 55 yards in sacks, but threw no interceptions, and San Diego won the turnover battle for the first time all season (4–1). Norman Hand intercepted a tipped pass to set up the game-winning field goal, and Junior Seau ended the final Eagles threat when he recovered a fumble caused by Charles Dimry.

Week 8: vs. Seattle Seahawks 

A much-improved offensive showing was not enough to prevent the Chargers from slipping to 3–5 heading into their bye. The Chargers gained a season-high 391 yards, and committed no turnovers for the second and final time all year. The Seahawks, however, took a 17–3 lead on the strength of two long touchdowns from Joey Galloway – an 81-yard reception and a 74-yard punt return. The Chargers responded, Mikhael Ricks catching a 5-yard scoring pass from Leaf (his first touchdown throw since the opener), and Means tying the score midway through the third quarter.

Seattle rebuilt their lead, and the Chargers trailed by 7 going into their final possession, starting on their own 20 with 2:43 to play. Leaf led the team all the way down to the Seahawks' 3-yard line, converting a 4th and 6 en route, but then threw three incompletions as time expired.

Week 10: at Denver Broncos 

Even with Bubby Brister filling in for the injured John Elway for much of the game, the unbeaten Broncos cruised to the win. San Diego could muster only two first downs through their first eight drives, which ended with seven punts and an interception thrown to ex-Charger Darrien Gordon by Leaf, who was then benched; his figures were 4 completions from 15 attempts, for just 26 yards. With the Broncos out of reach up 27–0, Craig Whelihan came in and had some success moving the offense, leading a 92-yard drive capped by a touchdown pass to Freddie Jones. Interim head coach June Jones named Whelihan the new starting QB after the game, a position he would remain in for the rest of the season.

Week 11: vs. Baltimore Ravens 

Whelihan won his first start of the season, though it was again the defense who deserved most of the credit, holding the Ravens to 161 total yards and eight first downs all game. Natrone Means sustained a season-ending foot injury, and Whelihan completed only 15 passes from 42 attempts, though he did manage a 47-yard touchdown to Charlie Jones. Ravens' errors played a part in the second Charger touchdown, as they twice prolonged the drive with penalties for leverage on field goal attempts. Terrell Fletcher finished the drive with a 3-yard touchdown run.

A controversial play occurred with six minutes left in the game, when Jermaine Lewis fell while hurdling a trip from punter Darren Bennett, got back to his feet and completed what appeared to be a 90-yard touchdown return. However, officials ruled that Bennett had made contact with his leg, and that Lewis was down at the Baltimore 45. The Ravens would settle for a field goal on that drive, and were stopped on downs inside their own 20 on their lone possession afterwards.

Week 12: at Kansas City Chiefs 

An improbable 4th quarter recovery saw the Chargers improve their record to 5–6. San Diego began brightly, a pair of rushing touchdowns by Terrell Fletcher and Tremayne Stephens putting them up 17–7 in the 2nd quarter. However, their offense then fell dormant for most of the game. Whelihan committed a pair of turnovers, and Bam Morris scored three times as the Chiefs ran off 27 unanswered points, going up 34–17 early in the 4th quarter. A second Fletcher touchdown run drew the Chargers within 10 points and, following a Pete Stoyanovich field goal, Whelihan hit Freddie Jones for a 25-yard touchdown on 4th and 13. The Chiefs responded by once again moving into field goal range, but Stoyanovich, who had missed a crucial playoff attempt in the same stadium four years earlier, saw his kick drift to the left with 51 seconds left. On the ensuing drive, James Hasty was twice flagged for pass interference, the second time on 4th and 10, and Whelihan found Charlie Jones for the game-winner from a yard out with 9 seconds left.

The offensive explosion was anomalous for the '98 Chargers. In no other game did they score more than 20 points, or more than two touchdowns.

Week 13: vs. Denver Broncos 

San Diego stayed with the 11–0 Broncos longer than expected, before falling away in the second half. In a scrappy game, where San Diego lost the turnover battle 6–4, a 13-yard Terrell Fletcher run drew the Chargers within four points late in the 1st quarter. On their next possession, San Diego reached a 2nd and 3 at the Denver 7, but Kenny Bynum fumbled away the opportunity. Despite managing to intercept John Elway on the next three Denver possessions (he only threw 10 picks all season), the Chargers didn't get that close to scoring again until the 4th quarter, when a 47-yard touchdown reception by Bryan Still was little more than a consolation. Whelihan passed for 300+ yards for the only time in his career, but was victimised by five interceptions, two of them thrown to Darrien Gordon.

Week 14: at Washington Redskins 

San Diego's lone touchdown came as a result of trickery, Terrell Fletcher passing to Freddie Jones on an HB option; Jones also caught a two-point conversion from Whelihan to tie the game at 14–14. Beyond that, they relied on the kicking of John Carney, who made four field goals from five attempts, the last of which put the Chargers up 20–17 in the final quarter. However, Trent Green threw a 20-yard touchdown to Leslie Shepherd with 1:48 to play, which stood up as the winning score after a Whelihan pass went through the hands of Freddie Jones and was intercepted.

Week 15: at Seattle Seahawks 

The Chargers were officially eliminated from playoff contention amidst a blizzard of turnovers. San Diego's defense made the first big play, Jamal Williams running an interception back 14 yards for a game-tying score. However, Whelihan threw interceptions on the next three drives, the first of which was run back for a touchdown, the third of which set the Seahawks up for a short scoring drive and a 21–7 lead. Terrell Fletcher's run halved the deficit shortly before halftime.

The errors continued in the second half. Whelihan threw another pick, and was benched for Ryan Leaf; Leaf's first pass was intercepted. Later, Leaf was sacked on consecutive plays, the second of these causing a fumble that Cortez Kennedy ran back for a touchdown. Whelihan came back in for the next series and was intercepted for the fifth time, then Leaf returned and threw his second pick. With Jon Kitna of the Seahawks also throwing three interceptions, the game saw ten in total, the most for 27 years, with the seven by the Chargers being the most by one team for 12 years.

Week 16: vs. Oakland Raiders 

This game featured considerably more offensive output than the teams' previous meeting, with the Raiders putting together back to back touchdown drives of 80 and 57 yards, en route to a 17–3 3rd-quarter lead. Whelihan threw a 39-yard touchdown pass to Mikhael Ricks, but the Chargers missed numerous scoring chances, three times turning the ball over on downs in Raider territory, and once via an interception.

Week 17: at Arizona Cardinals 

The Chargers ended the season on a five-game losing streak, beaten by a team with far more to play for. A 4-yard run by Adrian Murrell put Arizona ahead, and a record-tying four interceptions by Kwamie Lassiter kept them ahead 13–6 at the two-minute warning. However, a missed 42-yard field goal by Chris Jacke set up a dramatic finish. Whelihan converted a 4th and 3, before San Diego faced a 4th and 20 from the Arizona 30; Whelihan then connected with Ryan Thelwell to tie the score with just 16 seconds left. That proved to be long enough for the Cardinals, as former Charger Eric Metcalf ran the ensuing kickoff back to the Charger 44-yard line; after a quick completion moved them closer, Jacke made amends with a 52-yard kick to send his team into the playoffs.

Standings

References

San Diego Chargers
San Diego Chargers seasons
San Diego Chargers f